Derek Hood (born 17 December 1958) is an English former footballer who played as a defender.

Career
Born in Washington, Tyne and Wear, Hood was released after 5 months at West Bromwich Albion. After  a spell at  Hull City, he joined York City on 9 February 1980 for £2,000. He retired in May 1988 after suffering from a right knee injury. He enjoyed a testimonial game on 1 November 1988 when York City played a Derek Hood Select team.
Hood was the Clubman of the Year for York City in the 1982–83 season. After his football career finished, Hood lived and worked in Harrogate as a BT engineer.

References

1958 births
Living people
People from Washington, Tyne and Wear
Footballers from Tyne and Wear
English footballers
Association football midfielders
West Bromwich Albion F.C. players
Hull City A.F.C. players
York City F.C. players
Lincoln City F.C. players
English Football League players
British Telecom people